Seven Day Jesus (a.k.a. 7DJ or SDJ) was a Christian rock band formed in Huntington, West Virginia in 1994. The group disbanded in 1998, and reunited for one concert in 2004.

Band history
Seven Day Jesus was formed by childhood friends, singer and guitarist Brian McSweeney, rhythm guitarist Chris Beaty, bassist Wes Simpkins, and drummer Matt Sumpter.

The band self-released several albums before signing with 5 Minute Walk. After releasing  The Hunger in 1996, they were signed to ForeFront Records. In 1998, after a change in line-up, they released their self-titled album and changed their style significantly. The song "Butterfly" was nominated for Rock Recorded Song of the Year at the 1999 Dove  Awards. The band broke up shortly after.

They reunited in 2004 at Bleach's final live performance and  released a live album soon after, featuring two sets of songs from live performances in 1996 and 1998. McSweeney and Sumpter later formed  the rock band Matthew. Chris Beaty joined The O.C. Supertones in 2003 and played with them until they disbanded in 2005. He is currently a guitar technician for Switchfoot. Fox then played guitar in The Red Velvet and ran Huntington's Broadmoor Recording Studio. McSweeney toured with Audio Adrenaline for their final shows and has recorded a number of albums as a solo artist.

Band members

 Brian McSweeney — vocals, lead guitar
 Chris Beaty — rhythm guitar
 Russ Fox — bass guitar
 Kevin Adkins — drums
 Wes Simpkins – bass (1994–1997)
 Matt Sumpter – drums (1994–1997)

Discography
 1994: Sustenance
 1996: The Hunger
 1997: Seven Day Jesus
 2004: Seven Day Jesus Live

Singles
 "Always Comes Around"
 "O Holy Night" — Happy Christmas: A BEC Holiday Collection (1998)

Compilations
 "George" ("From Sustenance") appears on Hi! Here Is Our Alternative Compilation
 "Big House" Audio Adrenaline cover appears on Forefront Records' Ten: The Birthday Album (1998)
 "Butterfly" appears on Forefront Records' Seltzer 2 (1998)

Other
 "Always Comes Around", "Butterfly", and "Down with the Ship" from the self-titled album appear on the video game Original Dance Praise by Digital Praise, Inc (2005)

References

External links
 Seven Day Jesus at Jesus Freak Hideout

Christian rock groups from West Virginia
Musicians from Huntington, West Virginia
Musical groups established in 1994